Pillalamarri (Children's Banyan) or Peerlamarri (Saints Banyan) is an 800-year-old banyan tree located in Mahabubnagar, Telangana, India. The tree is spread over 4 acres. It is a major tourist attraction located 4 kilometers from Mahbubnagar city.

The sightseeing is partially closed as of November, 2018 because of the treatment being carried out for the plant. Viewing of the tree can only be done from outside the fence, going inside is closed.

History
The tree is known to be in existence since 1200 CE. It had original main trunk and many prop roots which resemble like many trunks, like its children, hence the name. Main trunk either died out or cannot be recognized among many prop roots, It is spread over three acres of land.

There are tombs of two Muslim Sufi saints, Jamal Hussain and Kamal Hussain in the vicinity. Some believe the tombs are under the tree, but the shrine is at a slight distance from the tree and there is a separate entrance to it.

There is also a beautifully reconstructed Sri Rajarajeswara temple on the premises. The temple was transplanted here from Erladinne (erula dinne) on the left bank of the Krishna river.

A board there says the village was about to be submerged during construction of the Srisailam reservoir when the state archaeology department dismantled the temple and moved it to the Pillalamarri complex in 1981. In 1983, the temple was reconstructed on a new foundation. It was originally built in the 16th Century in an architectural style distinct to the Vijayanagara dynasty that ruled in the area.

In 2003, it was announced that there would be a special cover to commemorate the tree.

Tree in ill health 
This ancient tree is currently in a delicate state of health. Apparently suffering from pest infestation and lack of water.  The tree is under quarantine.

Museum
The Pillalamarri Tourism Centre on the site has a science museum which houses some of the artifacts found in the Palamuru region. There is a small nursery and a deer park around the great tree, and some movies' scenes are shot there.

See also
 The Great Banyan
 List of Banyan trees in India
 List of individual trees
 List of oldest trees

References

Tourist attractions in Mahbubnagar district
Individual banyan trees
Individual trees in India